Buck Lake may refer to:

Buck Lake, Alberta, a hamlet in Canada
Buck Lake (Alberta), a lake in Alberta, Canada
Buck Lake 133C, an Indian reserve in Alberta, Canada
Buck Lake (Ontario), a lake in Ontario, Canada

See also
Bucks Lake